National Institute of Infectious Diseases may refer to:
National Institute of Infectious Diseases (Japan)
Infectious Disease Hospital, a hospital in Angoda, Sri Lanka, also known as National Institute of Infectious Diseases
National Institute of Allergy and Infectious Diseases, United States
Lazzaro Spallanzani National Institute for Infectious Diseases, Italy